Faumuina To'aletai Mafaufau David Tua  (born 21 November 1972), best known as David Tua, is a Samoan-New Zealand former professional boxer who competed from 1992 to 2013. A highly ranked heavyweight contender for most of his career, Tua was known for his formidable punching power, especially in his devastating left hook. He scored sixteen wins by knockout in the first round, which included knockouts of world heavyweight champions John Ruiz and Michael Moorer within thirty seconds of the first round, as well as late stoppages of world champions Oleg Maskaev and Hasim Rahman. He was ranked by BoxRec in the world's top 10 heavyweights from 1996 to 2003, reaching his highest ranking of No.3 in 1998. Tua ended his career with a knockout-to-win ratio of 82.6%. In a 2003 article by The Ring magazine, Tua was ranked 48th on a list of 100 greatest punchers of all time.

Nicknamed the "Tuamanator", his fast-paced bob and weave pressure fighting style has often drawn comparisons to Mike Tyson. Tua fought many of the best boxers of his era and challenged once for the unified world heavyweight title against Lennox Lewis in 2000. In his five professional losses, Tua was never subject to a stoppage, and possessed one of the most durable chins of his time.

Early life
Tua said that he lived with four brothers, four sisters and ten other relatives while growing up. Tua said that his mother worked three jobs, and Tua said that his father worked long hours. Tua said that his father forced him to start boxing when he was seven years old, and Tua said that he is grateful to his father for introducing him to boxing.

Amateur career
In his early career, Tua trained three days a week at a small gym in Mangere Bridge, under boxing trainer Gerry Preston. Tua became New Zealand national heavyweight champion in 1988 at age 15.

At the age of 19 Tua won a bronze medal at the 1992 Summer Olympics in Barcelona. He lost his semi-final to David Izonritei, whom he would later knock out as a professional. Tua turned professional later the same year.

Highlights
Amateur career breakdown:

 at the 1992 Summer Olympics, Barcelona, Spain (Heavyweight (– 91 kg))

Qualified at the 1992 National Olympic Trials, Apia, Samoa (Heavyweight)

 at the 1991 World Championships, Sydney, Australia (Heavyweight)

 at the 1991 New Zealand Championships (Heavyweight)
Finals: Defeated Toakipa Tasefa on points
1990 Junior World Championships, Lima, Peru (Heavyweight)

 at the 1990 Oceanian Championships, Nukuʻalofa, Tonga (Heavyweight)

 at the 1990 New Zealand Championships (Heavyweight)

 at the 1989 New Zealand Championships (Heavyweight)

 at the 1986 New Zealand Juniors Championships (Juniormiddleweight)

Professional career

Tua debuted in December 1992. Of his first 27 fights, 23 were won by knockout.

In Tua's 1997 fight against Ike Ibeabuchi, the two fighters combined to set the record for most punches thrown in a heavyweight fight on record. Ibeabuchi won the decision, handing Tua his first professional loss. Prior to this, Tua had scored devastating knockouts against future titlist John Ruiz (via 1st-round KO, in only 19 seconds) and Darroll Wilson.  Tua also beat David Izon and future champion Oleg Maskaev to set up the fight with Ibeabuchi.  After the loss to Ibeabuchi, Tua took on future champ Hasim Rahman and TKO'd Rahman in the 10th round. The victory over Rahman marked the beginning of Tua's struggles with his weight.  He ballooned up to 253 pounds when he defeated Obed Sullivan in 2000 by KO.  Later that year, he weighed 245 pounds in the loss to Lennox Lewis.  Tua was disappointing in the fight, with both fighters avoiding each other and Tua not throwing combinations. Tua lost a clear-cut decision.

The fight with Lewis was for the WBC, IBF, & IBO heavyweight titles and took place in November 2000. Tua lost on points by a wide margin.

Following the Lewis loss, Tua regained steam with a KO over Danell Nicholson but lost by a close decision in his next fight to future champion Chris Byrd.  In 2002 he beat prospect Fres Oquendo and demolished Michael Moorer in his next fight with a powerful shot 30 seconds into the first round, which put Moorer out cold.  In 2003 he drew in a 12-round rematch with Rahman.

2005 comeback
Tua was inactive for over two years before he stepped into the ring on 31 March 2005 and bested Talmadge Griffis in a 10-round bout—ending the match and earning a TKO victory with 26 seconds remaining. Tua's next contest in October 2005 ended in a split decision over Cisse Salif with Tua dominating in the late rounds.

Tua defeated Edward Gutierrez by knockout in the fourth round of a scheduled 10-rounder on 26 July 2006.  The fight was held at the Manhattan Center ballroom in New York City, and featured on ESPN2.  Tua started slowly, scored a knockdown with his famous left hook in the second round, and put Gutierrez down for the count in the fourth round with a combination of two left hooks, one to the head and the decisive one to the body.

In November 2006 Tua defeated Maurice Wheeler in the seventh round of a scheduled 10-rounder by knockout.  Tua ended the bout with a solid left uppercut to the body which immediately sent the howling Wheeler to the canvas.

Tua continued his comeback in February 2007 with a unanimous decision over Robert Hawkins in a 10-round bout.  Tua ended the match being the aggressor and hurt Hawkins in both the ninth and tenth rounds with body punches, but was unable to end the match with a knockout.

Tua, looking in good shape and weighing in at 237½ lbs (his lightest fight weight since 2001), was featured as the main event of a Pay Per View show on 18 August 2007 in Sandy, Utah and ended the bout quickly with a first-round knockout of Mexican champion Saul Montana.  Tua threw two powerful left hooks to the head that sent Montana sprawling to the canvas giving Tua his sixth win in a row.

Tua, again looking in good shape and weighing in at 234 lbs, fought the unheralded Cerrone Fox at the Soaring Eagle Casino, Mt. Pleasant, Michigan on 7 September 2007.  Tua made short work of his over matched opponent ending the bout at 1:41 of the second round.

While Tua's promoter, Cedric Kushner, stated Tua was scheduled to fight an opponent on 18 October 2007, the fight never materialized.

2009 comeback

Tua fought fellow New Zealander Shane Cameron at Mystery Creek, Hamilton on 3 October 2009 with Tua knocking Cameron out seven seconds into the second round to pick up the WBO Asia Pacific and Oriental Heavyweight titles. The promoters for the fight were John McRae and David Higgins of Duco Events. The fight had been scheduled for an earlier date, but was delayed due to Cameron having surgery on a fractured hand.

On 31 March 2010 Tua fought Friday Ahunanya, winning on points after 12 rounds. The fight promoters for this fight were again John McRae and David Higgins of Duco Events.

The Tua-Barrett fight had been tentatively scheduled for 26 June in São Paulo, Brazil. However, the fight was moved to 17 July at the Tropicana Casino and Resort in Atlantic City in a bid to promote David Tua's career in the United States. At 38 years old, Monte Barrett (34-9, 20 KOs) was viewed by some as an easy opponent for Tua as he had lost his previous three fights. The match was a controversial draw with Tua being knocked down for the first time in his professional career late in the 12th round.

Tua fought Demetrice King on 19 March 2011. Tua defeated King by unanimous decision with the scores of 100–91, 100–91, and 100–90.

Tua's rematch against Monte Barrett on 13 August 2011 resulted in a unanimous points decision going in favour of Barrett. The judges scored the bout 113–112, 115–112, and 115–112.

In December 2011, it emerged that Monte Barrett tested positive for banned stimulant methylhexanamine following a urine test after his 13 August points decision over Tua. Tua's lawyer, Blair Edwards, called for action against the 40-year-old New Yorker requesting the return of Tua's WBO Asia-Pacific and Oriental titles and the restoration of ranking points.

2013 comeback and retirement
In June 2013 it was confirmed that Tua was once again getting back into the ring. Belarusian Alexander Ustinov defeated him by unanimous points decision, following which he announced his retirement from professional boxing. Ringside Report were mixed in their evaluation of his career, referring to him as "one of the best heavyweights never to win a world title".

Outside the ring

On 10 October 1992 Tua appeared on the New Zealand version of the gameshow Wheel of Fortune. He had asked for an "O for Olsen" (possibly a reference to Olsen Filipaina) but this was heard by some (and widely reported) as "O for awesome". He requested "P" when buying a vowel on the same episode. He was also heard to ask if he could buy a "constonant" during the same show.

From 1992 to 2003, Tua was managed by former boxer Kevin Barry, who also trained him from 2001. But in 2003, Tua ended his business relationship with Barry and financial manager Martin Pugh. Though Barry accepted his dismissal as trainer, he resisted Tua's decision to end their contract, which still had two years to go.
In 2004, Tua's accountant learned that the boxer's finances with his boxing company, Tuaman Inc. Ltd., were tangled with company expenses; Tua no longer has most of his $NZ 20 million in purses from his professional matches, and important assets Tua thought he owned alone were anything but, including a piece of coastal land at Pakiri. Tuaman Inc. Ltd had business expenses flowing in various directions, involving companies and clients Tua had no knowledge of. Tua's own home was purchased with borrowed money, and the boxer's purses were linked to renovation costs for Martin Pugh's property. These findings were based on documents from Pugh's offices.

In 2005 Tua took Kevin Barry and Martin Pugh to court over their business arrangements. Barry and Pugh accused Tua of manipulating them to collect revenue, yet Tua maintained that he knew little of the men's affairs and did what they told him to do out of trust. The dispute gave both sides legal victories: over the issue of the coastal land property, the court ruled in favor of Barry and Pugh, since Tua failed to properly clarify his ownership over the land; on the issue of the terminated 2003 contract, the court ruled in Tua's favour, concluding he clearly owed no expenses to his former management from that contract. In October 2009, it was reported in The New Zealand Herald that the parties had settled all previously unresolved matters arising from the protracted litigation.

In May 2007, Cedric Kushner, president of Gotham Boxing Inc. and Tua's promoter, filed a $5 million lawsuit against IBF heavyweight champion Wladimir Klitschko and promoter Shelly Finkel among others – and while the lawsuit is unrelated to Tua, Kushner has stated he will drop the lawsuit if Tua is given a title bout against Klitschko in 2008, which ultimately failed to materialize.

In September 2009, Tua's aunt was killed in the Samoa tsunami. In early October he travelled to Samoa with cousin Va'aiga Tuigamala to see how they could help.

In the 2019 Queen's Birthday Honours, Tua was appointed an Officer of the New Zealand Order of Merit, for services to youth, boxing and the community, having previously been appointed a Member of the New Zealand Order of Merit, for services to boxing, in the 2001 New Year Honours.

In 1996, Tua was honored by the country of Tuvalu, with a stamp commemorating the 1996 Summer Olympic Games in Atlanta, Georgia, United States bearing Tua's likeness and name on it.

In popular culture

Tua is mentioned in an episode of the animated series Family Guy, when character Stewie draws Tua's likeness on a wall.
In 2020, he is seen to be in a gathering opposing the legalisation of recreational use of cannabis.

Professional boxing record

Awards and recognitions
2022 Florida Boxing Hall of Fame
2020 US National Boxing Hall of Fame
2020 NZ Boxing Hall of Fame
2019 Gladrap Boxing Hall of fame

References

External links

1972 births
Living people
Samoan male boxers
Heavyweight boxers
Boxers at the 1992 Summer Olympics
Officers of the New Zealand Order of Merit
Olympic boxers of New Zealand
Olympic bronze medalists for New Zealand
Olympic medalists in boxing
People educated at Otahuhu College
Boxers trained by Kevin Barry
People from A'ana
Samoan emigrants to New Zealand
New Zealand male boxers
AIBA World Boxing Championships medalists
Medalists at the 1992 Summer Olympics